The Australian cricket team toured England and Ireland in June and July 2012. Australia played a One Day International (ODI) against Ireland on 23 June, and a five-match ODI series against England from 29 June to 10 July. They also played two List A tour matches against English county sides Leicestershire Foxes and Essex Eagles. The tour was put in jeopardy at the start of June 2012, when industrial action was threatened by the Australian Cricketers' Association because of a dispute over the inclusion of performance-related pay in the contract between the players and Cricket Australia.

Squads

† Peter Forrest replaced the withdrawn Michael Hussey.

Ireland

Only ODI

England

Tour matches

50-over: Leicestershire Foxes v Australians

50-over: Essex Eagles v Australians

ODI series

1st ODI

2nd ODI

3rd ODI

4th ODI

5th ODI

References

2012 in English cricket
2012 in Irish cricket
2012
2012
International cricket competitions in 2012
2012 in Australian cricket